Bernard Prior (12 May 1934 – 17 June 2012) was an English professional rugby league footballer who played in the 1950s and 1960s, and coached in the 1960s and 1970s.

Background
Bernard Prior was born in Leeds, West Riding of Yorkshire, England, he was a pupil at Hunslet St Joseph's, and was selected for Hunslet Schools' R.L. and Yorkshire County, he worked as an electrician, he ran a newsagent's shop on Parnaby Road, Hunslet, and he died in Oulton, West Yorkshire.

Playing career

International honours
Bernard Prior won a cap for Great Britain while at Hunslet in 1966 against France.

County honours
Bernard Prior represented Yorkshire while at Leeds against Cumberland at Hull in September 1959.

Championship final appearances
Bernard Prior played  in Wakefield Trinity's 21-9 victory over St. Helens in the Championship Final replay during the 1966–67 season at Station Road, Swinton on Wednesday 10 May 1967.

Challenge Cup Final appearances
Bernard Prior played  in Leeds' 9-7 victory over Barrow in the 1957 Challenge Cup Final during the 1956–57 season at Wembley Stadium, London on Saturday 11 May 1957, in front of a crowd of 76,318, and played  in Hunslet's 16-20 defeat by Wigan in the 1965 Challenge Cup Final during the 1964–65 season at Wembley Stadium, London on Saturday 8 May 1965, in front of a crowd of 89,016.

County Cup Final appearances
Bernard Prior played  in Hunslet's 12-2 victory over Hull Kingston Rovers in the 1962 Yorkshire County Cup Final during the 1968–69 season at Headingley Rugby Stadium, Leeds on Saturday 27 October 1962, and played  in the 8-17 defeat by Bradford Northern in the 1965 Yorkshire County Cup Final during the 1965–66 season at Headingley Rugby Stadium, Leeds on Saturday 16 October 1965.

Notable tour matches
Bernard Prior played , and scored a try in Leeds' 18-13 victory over Australia in the 1956–57 Kangaroo tour of Great Britain match at Headingley Rugby Stadium during October 1956.

Club career
Bernard Prior was transferred from Leeds to Hunslet during January 1961 as part of the world record transfer fee of £13,250 for Brian Shaw (based on increases in average earnings, this would be approximately £583,000 in 2013). The deal that took Brian Shaw from Hunslet to Leeds in a cash plus player deal, that included Bernard Prior and another Leeds player; Norman Burton.

Genealogical information
Bernard Prior's marriage to Jean (née Miller) was registered during fourth ¼ 1957 in Leeds District, they had two children; Antony D. Prior (birth registered fourth ¼  in Leeds district), and Karen L. Prior (birth registered second ¼  in Leeds district), and three grandchildren; Joseph, and George Prior, and Lucy McCay.

References

External links
!Great Britain Statistics at englandrl.co.uk (statistics currently missing due to not having appeared for both Great Britain, and England)
Hunslet mark centenary of amazing four cup season
Bernard Prior RIP
PRIOR Bernard : Obituary

1934 births
2012 deaths
English rugby league coaches
English rugby league players
Great Britain national rugby league team players
Hunslet F.C. (1883) players
Leeds Rhinos players
Rugby league players from Leeds
Rugby league hookers
Wakefield Trinity players
Yorkshire rugby league team players